Elonex is a British computer hardware and related IT services company that develops eBook Readers, Android eTouch Tablets, and other consumer electronics.

History

Elonex was founded in Finchley, London in 1986 by the German-born Israel Wetrin. The name was derived from the last two letters of Wetrin's two sons, Daniel and Gideon, and the first two letters of "export". Today, the company is based in Birmingham.

Elonex was the official LED supplier to the Super League, the UK’s top tier Rugby league competition. The contract was mutually terminated in June 2012.

Between 1994 and 1999, Elonex was the shirt sponsor of Wimbledon F.C. The company currently sponsors two English rugby union teams, London Irish and Worcester Warriors, and also sponsors Worcestershire County Cricket Club.

Products
In addition to their well-known Elonex ONE, the Elonex eBook debuted in July 2009.

See also
Mesh Computers
Viglen

References

External links 
 

Manufacturing companies based in Birmingham, West Midlands
Companies established in 1986
Computer hardware companies
Computer companies of the United Kingdom
1986 establishments in England
British brands